Model 500 may refer to:

A pseudonym used by techno music producer Juan Atkins
Smith & Wesson Model 500, a revolver
Model 500 telephone, a model manufactured by Western Electric